La Cotte de St Brelade is a Paleolithic site of early habitation in Saint Brélade, Jersey. Cotte means "cave" in Jèrriais. The cave is also known as Lé Creux ès Fées (The Fairies' Cave).

Neanderthals lived there at various times between around 250,000 years ago and after 48,000 years ago—making it the earliest known occupation of the Channel Islands by a hominin species, and also possibly one of the last Neanderthal sites in northwestern Europe. It is the only site in the British Isles to have produced late Neanderthal fossils.

At that time, with sea levels slightly below those at present, Jersey was part of Normandy, a peninsula jutting out from the coast, and La Cotte would have been a prominent landmark on the dry plain that linked Jersey to the French mainland. It was not until after the last Ice age that the sea eroded the coastline, separating first Guernsey, then Jersey and finally the Écréhous from the mainland.

Making fire 

Remains of fire was found in La Cotte. In fact, the earliest dates obtained for artifacts at the site (238,000 BP) come from thermoluminescence dating of burnt flint.

Cultural evolution 

The immense timespan represented by the Paleolithic artifacts at La Cotte—nearly 200,000 years—saw considerable cultural changes among the prehistoric users of the site. The earliest stone tools, dated between around 240,000 years to 200,000 BP, are fairly typical of early Middle Paleolithic sites. From around 200,000 BP, however, there is noticeable elaboration in the procedures used to manufacture stone implements, with an increased use of Levallois (prepared core) techniques, and an increased efficiency of raw material usage as tools were resharpened and reused for multiple purposes throughout their ‘lifetimes’. Dated at approximately 180,000 BP, two piles of animal bones, consisting of selected cuts of mammoths and woolly rhinoceros, appear to have been dragged beneath an overhang after being butchered. These innovations mark a transition stage between Middle and Upper Paleolithic subsistence strategies.

Excavation timeline 

Excavations have taken place from around 1910 onwards.

Robert R. Marett (1866–1943) worked on the palaeolithic site from 1910–1914, recovering some hominid teeth and other remains of habitation by Neanderthals. He published "The Site, Fauna, and Industry of La Cotte de St. Brelade, Jersey" (Archaeologia LXVII, 1916). The teeth were dated using new techniques in 2013, this analysis put them at between 100,000 and 47,000 years old.

In 1911, Arthur Smith Woodward (director of the geology department at the British Museum of Natural History) was asked by R.R. Marrett to inspected the findings at La Cotte. At the time, Woodward was engaged in the archaeological discovery of "Piltdown man", which later became notorious as a hoax, and he used a comparison of findings at La Cotte to argue for an early dating of his Piltdown material.

The Cambridge University excavations of the 1960s and 1970s found important examples of remains of Pleistocene mammals carried into La Cotte, including a pile of bones and teeth of woolly mammoth and woolly rhinoceros. King Charles III took part (as a student) in these excavations, directed by Professor Charles McBurney (archaeologist), which were later published.

Katharine Scott, in 1980, published an article on the hunting methods used by Neanderthals at La Cotte in which she argues that they stampeded and drove the mammoths off the nearby cliffs, but this theory has since been disputed.

In 2010 excavations were renewed at La Cotte by a multi-disciplinary team from British Institutions including UCL, The British Museum, the University of Southampton, University of Wales Trinity Saint David and the University of St Andrew's. These on-going excavations revealed new archaeological levels at the site and determined the presence of deposits younger than 47,000 years ago still present at the site.

See also 

 Archaeology of the Channel Islands
 La Hougue Bie

References

Further reading
 Balleine's History of Jersey
 The Mystery of the Cave, Sonia Hilsdon
 The Grisly Folk, H.G. Wells
 "La Cotte de St. Brelade 1961 – 1978: Excavations by C.B.M. McBurney." (Geo Books, Norwich).
 "Two hunting episodes of Middle Paleolithic Age at La Cotte Saint-Brelade, Jersey (Channel Islands)" (World Archeology 12:137–152. )
 "Prehistory and the Beginnings of Civilization. Volume: 1". by Jacquetta Hawkes – author, Leonard Woolley – author. (1963), p140.
 "Making fire in the Stone Age: flint and pyrite" published in "Geologie en Mijnbouw", 1999, vol. 78, no. 2, pp. 147–164(18) by Stapert D[1].; Johansen L.[2] / [1]Groningen Institute of Archaeology, Poststraat 6, 9712 ER Groningen, the Netherlands [2]Institut for Arkæologi og Etnologi, Vandkunsten 5, 1167 København K, Denmark

External links

 The Quaternary Archaeology and Environments of Jersey project (QAEJ)

History of Jersey
Saint Brélade
Archaeological sites in Jersey
Caves of Jersey
Neanderthal sites